The All Parties Conference was a group of Indian political parties known for organizing a committee in May 1928 to author the Constitution of India after independence was actualized. It was chaired by Dr. M. A. Ansari. A draft constitution, known as the Nehru Report, was adopted by the All Parties Conference in Lucknow, in 1928. Members of the All Parties Conference included the Indian National Congress, All-India Hindu Mahasabha, All-India Muslim League, All-India Conference of Indian Christians, All India States Peoples' Conference, and Central Khalifat Committee. In its meeting from 28 August 1928 to 31 August 1928, the All Parties Conference recommended dominion status for India.

References 

1928 in British India
Indian independence movement